The Pennsylvania State Education Association (PSEA) represents more than 187,000 teachers, educational support professionals, counselors, curriculum specialists, librarians, health care workers, school nurses, school dental hygienists, school nurses, school psychologists, school social workers, vocational-technical instructors, community college and junior college educators, students and retirees in the state of Pennsylvania.

PSEA represents the labor, policy, and professional interests of its members. PSEA bargains compensation and benefits, protects members’ rights, and advocates for their professions.

Composition

According to PSEA's Department of Labor records since 2005, when membership classifications were first reported, around 80% of the union's membership are classified as "active" or "life" members, with eligibility to vote in the union. Other, voting ineligible, classifications include "retired," "student," "reserve" and "substitute/associate." PSEA contracts also cover some non-members, known as agency fee payers, which since 2005 have numbered comparatively about 3% of the size of the union's membership. As of 2014 this accounts for 27,809 "retirees" (15% of total), 7,902 "students" (4%), 816 "reserve," and 552 "substitutes/associates" (both <1%), plus 5,662 non-members paying agency fees, compared to 142,406 "active" members.

Mission
The stated mission of the Pennsylvania State Education Association is "To advocate for quality public education and our members through collective action." Its stated vision is "To be the preeminent voice for education and the leading force for labor in Pennsylvania."

Leadership
PSEA is a member-driven organization, headed by elected Officers, an Executive Director, and a Board of Directors.

 Rich Askey, PSEA President, teaches Music in Harrisburg, PA.
 Aaron Chapin, PSEA Vice President, is a social studies teacher in the Stroudsburg Area School District.
 Jeff Ney, PSEA Treasurer, is an elementary teacher in the Wilkes Barre, PA.
 Jim Vaughan is PSEA Executive Director.

References

External links
 

National Education Association
Education in Pennsylvania
Organizations based in Harrisburg, Pennsylvania
State wide trade unions in the United States
Trade unions in Pennsylvania